Węże may refer to the following places in Poland:
Węże, Łódź Voivodeship (central Poland)
Węże, Masovian Voivodeship (east-central Poland)